Salcedo is an unincorporated community in Scott County, in the U.S. state of Missouri.

Salcedo was founded in the 1890s, and named after Juan Manuel de Salcedo, a Spanish colonial politician.

References

Unincorporated communities in Scott County, Missouri
Unincorporated communities in Missouri